John Hay was a Scottish professional footballer who played as a right back.

Career
Born in Renfrew, Hay played for Bathgate, Bradford City and St Bernard's.

For Bradford City he made 3 appearances in the Football League.

Sources

References

Year of birth missing
Year of death missing
Scottish footballers
Bathgate F.C. players
Bradford City A.F.C. players
St Bernard's F.C. players
English Football League players
Association football fullbacks